Dmitri Vadimovich Alekseyev (born 28 February 1973) is a former Russian professional footballer.

Club career
He made his debut in the Russian Premier League in 1993 for FC Zhemchuzhina Sochi.

External links

1973 births
Footballers from Saint Petersburg
Living people
Russian footballers
Association football goalkeepers
FC Zhemchuzhina Sochi players
FC Elista players
FC Shinnik Yaroslavl players
FC Rubin Kazan players
FC Luch Vladivostok players
FC Metallurg Lipetsk players
FC Lokomotiv Nizhny Novgorod players
Russian Premier League players
FC SKA-Khabarovsk players
FC Dynamo Saint Petersburg players
FC Dynamo Bryansk players